"Let It Rock" is the debut single by American musician Kevin Rudolf. It was produced by Rudolf for his debut album, In the City, and features a verse from American rapper Lil Wayne.

In the U.S. and Canada, the song reached No. 5 on the Billboard Hot 100, number No. 6 on the Pop 100 and No. 2 on the Canadian Hot 100. The first week, the song debuted at No. 45 on the Australian Singles Chart and eventually reached No. 3. In the United Kingdom, the song climbed to No. 40 on physical release but due to an increase in airplay, due to BBC Radio 1 adding it to their A-list, the song climbed thirty places to No. 10 in the song's second week on the chart; then it rose to No. 5 the following week. "Let It Rock" was number 28 on Rolling Stones list of the 100 Best Songs of 2008.

The single was also the official theme song for WWE's 2009 Royal Rumble. It is also featured in the video games Madden NFL 11 and Guitar Hero Live. According to in-game files, the song was also originally meant to appear on Grand Theft Auto V  radio station, but it was not included in the final release of the game for unknown reasons. "Let It Rock" was featured in tourism ads for Atlantic City, New Jersey in 2013.

"Let It Rock" was certified triple platinum by the RIAA on May 5, 2009. As of July 2011, the song has sold 4,000,000 digital downloads, making it Lil Wayne's third 4-million-seller.

Meaning

Rudolf explained what "Let It Rock" is about, saying: "'Let It Rock' was written from a place of anger and dissatisfaction with the world. It's a song about hypocrisy. It contains biblical references - and yet people still think it's a party song. Whatever works." Rudolf said about "Let It Rock": "It's a song about the hypocrisy in the world, and I'm saying that when I come through, I'm bringing the truth," Rudolf explained. Rudolf then said: "I use the Parable of the Prodigal Son, because I want to expose all the fakes out there — in the music industry, in the world, anywhere. A lot of people think it's a party record, but it's not."

Track listing
Digital download
 "Let It Rock" (featuring Lil Wayne) - 3:56

U.S. digital CD single
 "Let It Rock" (clean) (featuring Lil Wayne) - 3:56
 "Let It Rock" (explicit) (featuring Lil Wayne) - 3:56
 "Let It Rock" (instrumental) - 3:50
 "Let It Rock" (explicit a cappella) (featuring Lil Wayne) - 3:50

UK digital CD single
 "Let It Rock" (album version) (featuring Lil Wayne) - 3:56
 "Let It Rock" (Filthy Dukes remix) (featuring Lil Wayne) - 6:35
 "Let It Rock" (Cahill remix) (featuring Lil Wayne) - 6:11
 "Let It Rock" (radio edit) (featuring Lil Wayne) - 3:54
 "Let It Rock" (solo version) - 2:48

Music video
The music video for "Let It Rock" features Kevin Rudolf and Lil Wayne performing in front of both a crowd and a dark background, sometimes lit with various effects such as strobe and laser lights.

Samples
The song's chorus is also featured in the Iyaz song "Damn They Hot", which features Rudolf himself. The song is also sampled and incorporated into Natasha Bedingfield's song "All I Need" from her album Strip Me, which also features Rudolf.

Charts

Weekly charts

Year-end charts

Certifications

References

External links

2008 debut singles
2008 songs
Kevin Rudolf songs
Lil Wayne songs
Cash Money Records singles
Songs written by Lil Wayne
Songs written by Kevin Rudolf